Murat Marine Park (formerly Murat Commonwealth Marine Reserve) is a marine protected area located in the Great Australian Bight south of South Australia in waters within the Australian Exclusive economic zone to the west of the island group known as the Nuyts Archipelago and ranging in depth from  to .  

It was gazetted in November 2012.  It was renamed on 11 October 2017.

The marine park includes ecosystems representative of a feature known as the "Great Australian Bight Shelf Transition", two "key ecological features" being "benthic invertebrate communities’’ and "areas important for small pelagic fish", and the feeding areas for the following species - Australian sea lion, great white shark, short-tailed shearwater and Caspian tern.  It also provides protection for a submerged reef system known as "Yatala Reef".

It is part of a group of Australian marine parks  known as the South-west Marine Parks Network.  

The marine park is classified as an IUCN Category II protected area.

See also
Protected areas managed by the Australian government

References

External links
Webpage for the Murat Commonwealth Marine Reserve on the Protected Planet website

Australian marine parks
Protected areas established in 2012
2012 establishments in Australia
Great Australian Bight